Salamat Ahuoiza Aliu is a Nigerian neurosurgeon.

Early life and education 
Salamat Ahuoiza Aliu, was born in Ilorin in 1980, but is a native of Okene, Kogi State. She attended the medical school in University of Ilorin to get her first degree. She trained and specialized in neurosurgery in Usmanu Danfodiyo University under Prof BB Shehu

Medical career 
Aliu is the first female neurosurgeon in West Africa. She is also the first indigenous-trained female neurosurgeon in Nigeria. She currently works at University of Ilorin Teaching Hospital.

Awards and achievements 
Noted for her exceptional work in neurosurgery and encouragement of women to join the neurological field, Aliu was listed in the top 100 persons of the year by Arewa socio-political group in 2016.

Personal life 
Aliu is married with children.

Publications 

 "Knotting of a nasogastric feeding tube in a child with head injury: A case report and review of literature."

In this publication Aliu, alongside seven other physicians, discuss the complications that can arise from the placement of a nasogastric tube, a common procedure for patients that are unable to feed themselves. In previous case studies regarding nasogastric tubes, complications such a coiling and knotting are blamed on small bore tubes and are said to be more common in patients with small stomachs. However, Aliu and her colleagues challenge the position that small stomachs are at a greater risk for tube knotting, based on the extreme rarity of related complications in children. Instead, they argue that factors such as excess tube length, gastric surgery, and reduced gastric tone, specifically due to head injury, are the most reasonable predispositions for nasogastric tube knotting.

 "Using the head as a mould for cranioplasty with methylmethacrylate."

Aliu and colleagues discuss the benefits of using methacrylate in the absence of custom bone, which can be too expensive or unavailable during a cranioplasty. They further describe cranioplasty techniques leading to successful outcomes when employing methacrylate.

 "Subdural actinomycoma presenting as recurrent chronic subdural hematoma."

In this joint publication with the previously mentioned colleagues, Aliu brings to light a rare chronic bacterial infection in the brain called subdural actinomycoma, which is commonly mistaken radiologically with a subdural hematoma or an empyema.

References 

1980 births
University of Ilorin alumni
People from Ilorin
Living people
Nigerian women medical doctors
Nigerian neurosurgeons